Talent Scout is a 1937 musical drama film directed by William Clemens and starring Donald Woods, Jeanne Madden and Fred Lawrence. It is also known by the alternative title of Studio Romance.

The film's sets were designed by the art director Esdras Hartley.

Premise
After being fired from his job at a film studio, a talent agent attempts to build his new discovery into a star.

Partial cast

References

Bibliography
 Steven Bingen. Warner Bros.: Hollywood's Ultimate Backlot. Rowman & Littlefield, 2014.

External links
 

1937 films
1930s musical drama films
American musical drama films
Films directed by William Clemens
Warner Bros. films
American black-and-white films
1937 drama films
1930s English-language films
1930s American films